is a sub-kilometer asteroid, classified as near-Earth object and potentially hazardous asteroid of the Aten group with a very well determined orbit. It was discovered on 29 November 2000, by astronomers of the Lincoln Near-Earth Asteroid Research (LINEAR) at the Lincoln Laboratory's Experimental Test Site near Socorro, New Mexico, in the United States. It is a contact binary.

Orbit 

The orbit of this potentially hazardous asteroid (PHA) has been well-established with 20 years of observations. It orbits from inside the orbit of Mercury out to the orbit of Mars. It makes close approaches to all of the inner planets.

2020 
The asteroid came to perihelion on 13 October 2020 when it passed the Sun going . The asteroid was not more than 60 degrees from the Sun until 26 November 2020 and was observed by Goldstone radar on 27 November 2020. On 29 November 2020 the asteroid passed  from Earth. Even the 2018 orbit solution had a known accuracy of roughly ±150 km for the close approach. With the radar observations the close approach distance is known with an accuracy of roughly ±5 km.

2140 
This asteroid will pass  from Earth on 1 December 2140. The 2140 close approach distance is known with an accuracy of roughly ±1000 km. For comparison, the distance to the Moon is about 0.0026 AU (384,400 km).

The Jupiter Tisserand invariant, used to distinguish different kinds of orbits, is 6.228.

Physical characteristics 

In the SMASS classification, the object's spectral type is that of an X-type. According to the space-based survey by NASA's NEOWISE mission, the asteroid measures 510 meters in diameter and its surface has an albedo of 0.129.

Numbering and naming 

This minor planet was numbered by the Minor Planet Center on 2 April 2007. As of 2018, it has not been named.



See also

Notes

References

External links 
 List Of The Potentially Hazardous Asteroids (PHAs), Minor Planet Center
 
 
 

153201
153201
153201
153201
20001129
153201
153201